Olga Viktorovna Lazarchuk (born 3 December 1981) is a retired Ukrainian tennis player.

Her highest WTA singles ranking is 146, which she reached on 9 May 2005. Her career high in doubles is 326, which she reached on 13 September 2004. Lazarchuk won four singles titles and one doubles title on the ITF Circuit in her career. Her favourite court is clay.

She took part in the 2005 Hyderabad Open qualifying but retired in the second round to Mandy Minella.

Lazarchuk played her last match on the circuit 2005. She finally retired from professional tennis in 2014.

ITF Circuit finals

Singles: 6 (4–2)

Doubles: 4 (1–3)

External links
 
 

Living people
Ukrainian female tennis players
1981 births
21st-century Ukrainian women